{{Speciesbox
| image = OxycercichVelifGrahamEdgar.jpg
| taxon = Oxycercichthys veliferus
| display_parents = 3
| authority = (Lubbock, 1980)<ref name = CoFSp>{{Cof record|spid=9128|title=Pseudochromis veliferus|access-date=21 October 2018}}</ref>
| parent_authority = Gill, 2004
| synonyms = *Pseudochromis veliferus Lubbock, 1980 Ogilbyina velifera (Lubbock, 1980)
}}
The sailfin dottyback (Oxycercichthys veliferus''), also known as the longtail dottyback, is a species of ray-finned fish from the family Pseudochromidae, the dottybacks from the Western Central Pacific where it is found on the Great Barrier Reef and other coral reefs in the Coral Sea, where it is occurs inshore near rock and coral formations where there are sandy bottoms. This fish occasionally makes its way into the aquarium trade. It is pale greyish to yellowish in colour and has bluish upperparts, a bluish dorsal fin which fades to yellow posteriorly and it has a dark blue spot at the anterior end of the dorsal fin.

References

External links
 

Pseudochrominae
Fish described in 1980